Cereja is a village in Spain in the exclave of Llívia, located on the region of the Baixa Cerdanya. The small village is placed at the bottom of Puig del Tudó, near the ditch of Angostrina, to the northwest of the Llívia nucleus.

References

Populated places in Cerdanya (comarca)